Jin'ichi or Jinichi (written: 任一 or 仁一) is a masculine Japanese given name. Notable people with the name include:

 (born 1949), Japanese academic and ninjutsu practitioner
 (1888–1972), Imperial Japanese Navy admiral

Japanese masculine given names